Boughton is a village and a civil parish  in the English county of Norfolk.

History
Boughton derives from the Anglo-Saxon meaning 'Bucca's' farmstead.

In the Domesday Book, Boughton was a settlement of 24 households and was divided between Reginald, son of Ivo and Ralph Baynard.

Transport
The village is north of the route A134 which links King’s Lynn to Colchester. The nearest railway station is at Downham Market for the Fen Line which runs between King’s Lynn and Cambridge. The nearest airport is Norwich International Airport, although unusually for a village of this size, it has two separate airstrips, Boughton North and Boughton South. For the purposes of local government, the parish falls within the district of King's Lynn and West Norfolk.

Notable residents
John Young Stratton (1829/30 – 1905): author, essayist, social reformer and campaigner against rural poverty.
John Ashworth, clergyman Dean of Trinidad from 1948 to 1954

War Memorial
Boughton's War Memorial is located in All Saints' Churchyard and takes the form of a stone cross.
 Private Walter W. Veal (d.1918), 12th Battalion, East Surrey Regiment
 Private Frederick Veal (d.1918), 10th Battalion, Essex Regiment
 Private James W. Rix (1888-1917), 7th Battalion, Royal Norfolk Regiment
 John Bray
 George Seymour

References

External links

Boughton Parish Council
Boughton Fen
Information from Genuki Norfolk on Boughton.
 http://kepn.nottingham.ac.uk/map/place/Norfolk/Boughton

Villages in Norfolk
King's Lynn and West Norfolk
Civil parishes in Norfolk